Minuscule 265 (in the Gregory-Aland numbering), ε 285 (Soden), is a Greek minuscule manuscript of the New Testament, on parchment. Paleographically it has been assigned to the 12th century. It has marginalia.

Description 

The codex contains the text of the four Gospels on 372 parchment leaves. The text is written in one column per page, in 19 lines per page. The text of Matthew 13:24-33 was added by a later hand.

There is also a division according to the Ammonian Sections (in Mark 233 Sections, the last in 16:8), with references to the Eusebian Canons (written below Ammonian Section numbers).

Text 

The Greek text of the codex is a representative of the Byzantine text-type. Aland did not place it in any Category.
According to the Claremont Profile Method it belongs to the textual family Πa in Luke 1, Luke 10, and Luke 20, as a core member.

History 

The manuscript once belonged to Philibert de la Mare.
The manuscript was added to the list of New Testament manuscripts by Scholz (1794-1852). 
It was examined and described by Paulin Martin. C. R. Gregory saw the manuscript in 1885.

The manuscript is currently housed at the Bibliothèque nationale de France (Gr. 66) at Paris.

See also 

 List of New Testament minuscules
 Biblical manuscript
 Textual criticism

References

Further reading 

 Jean-Pierre-Paul Martin, Description technique des manuscrits grecs, relatif au Nouveau Testament, conservé dans les bibliothèques des Paris (Paris 1883), p. 56

External links 

 R. Waltz, Minuscule 265, Encyclopedia of Textual Criticism
 Microfilm images online at the CSNTM.

Greek New Testament minuscules
12th-century biblical manuscripts
Bibliothèque nationale de France collections